Can't Get Enough is an album by Australian guitarist Tommy Emmanuel that was released in Australia in October 1996 and peaked at number 26 on the ARIA Charts. The album was renamed Midnight Drive for its American release.

At the ARIA Music Awards of 1997, the album was nominated for the ARIA Award for Best Adult Contemporary Album but lost to Good Luck by My Friend the Chocolate Cake.

Reception

Jonathan Widran from AllMusic said "The overall mix is the kind that smooth jazz lovers find easy to swallow, but offers more bite and adventure than most like-minded releases in the genre. Smooth jazz radio may find an easy mark with a laid-back take of Sting's "Fields of Gold" but Emmanuel's other tracks dig deeper, showing off a stylistic chameleon drawing from the many phases of his career. His soft pop side comes out on power ballads "No More Goodbyes" and "Stay Close to Me" adding "He darts in a lot of directions, and that willingness... sets him apart from those who make their marks just playing the same old lines."

Track listing

Personnel
 Tommy Emmanuel – guitar
 Warren Hill – saxophone
 Randy Goodrum – organ, piano, keyboards
 James Roche – guitar, percussion, keyboards
 Larry Carlton – guitar
 Robben Ford – guitar
 Nathan East – bass guitar, keyboards, programming
 Tom Brechtlein – guitar, drums
 Janine Maunder – vocals
 Kevin Murphy – vocals

Charts

References

1996 albums
Tommy Emmanuel albums